The Elect Lady is an 1888 novel by George MacDonald.

Plot introduction
The story is centered upon three main characters: Andrew, a poor, scholarly, godly man; Dawtie, a simple servant girl who cares for animals; and Alexa, the landlord's daughter and the landlord himself.

External links
 

  http://georgemacdonald.podbean.com/

1888 British novels
Novels by George MacDonald